Strážovice is a municipality and village in Hodonín District in the South Moravian Region of the Czech Republic. It has about 600 inhabitants.

History
The first written mention of Strážovice is from 1141, in a deed of Bishop Jindřich Zdík.

Notable people
Jano Köhler (1873–1941), painter; lived here and is buried here

Gallery

References

External links

Villages in Hodonín District
Moravian Slovakia